In Search of Wonder: Essays on Modern Science Fiction is a collection of critical essays by American writer Damon Knight. Most of the material in the original version of the book was originally published between 1952 and 1955 in various science fiction magazines including Infinity Science Fiction, Original SF Stories, and Future SF. The essays were highly influential, and contributed to Knight's stature as the foremost critic of science fiction of his generation.  The book also constitutes an informal record of the "Boom Years" of science fiction from 1950-1955.

In the opening chapter, Knight states his "credos", two of which are:

One essay in the book is "Cosmic Jerrybuilder: A. E. van Vogt", a review of the 1945 magazine serialization of A. E. van Vogt's The World of Null-A, in which  Knight "exposed the profound irrationality lying at the heart of much traditional science fiction".

In 1956 Knight was awarded a Hugo as "Best Book Reviewer" based largely on the essays reprinted in this book.

Publishing history
In Search of Wonder was originally issued by Advent:Publishers in hardcover in 1956. Advent reissued it in both hardcover and trade paperback in 1960. The second, expanded, edition was published by Advent in hardcover in 1967, with trade paperback reprints following in 1968 and 1974. The second edition was more than 120 pages longer and included six added chapters. Advent published a third, further expanded edition, nearly 100 pages longer than the second edition, in 1996. The third edition adds roughly 30,000 words of text and augments the bibliography and index; it incorporates six new chapters and expands Knight's discussion of longtime editor John W. Campbell Jr. Orion released an ebook edition in 2013.

Quotes

On defining science fiction:

 "Science fiction ... means what we point to when we say it." (1st ed., p. 1)

On criticism:

 "Why should anybody rip a bad work of art to shreds? Why, to find out how it is made." (1st ed., p. 14)

On science fiction writers:

 A. E. van Vogt "is no giant; he is a pygmy who has learned to operate an overgrown typewriter." (1st ed., p. 50)
 "[Ray] Bradbury's subject is childhood and the buried child-in-man; his aim is to narrow the focus, not to widen it; to shrink all the big frightening things to the compass of the familiar: a spaceship to a tin can; a Fourth of July rocket to a brass kettle; a lion to a Teddy bear." (1st ed., p. 77)

On science fiction novels:

 I Am Legend by Richard Matheson "is full of good ideas, every other one of which is immediately dropped and kicked out of sight." (1st ed., p. 51)
 "The Blind Spot, by Austin Hall and Homer Eon Flint, is an acknowledged classic of fantasy, first published in 1921; much praised since then, several times reprinted, venerated by connoisseurs - all despite the fact that the book has no recognizable vestige of merit." (1st ed., p. 14)

On British writers:

 "The only thing worse than a bad American novel is a bad British one." (1st ed., p. 71)

Contents

Following is a list of chapters in the first edition (1956).

Introduction by Anthony Boucher
Author's Note
 Critics
 The Classics
 Chuckleheads
 Campbell and His Decade
 Cosmic Jerrybuilder: A. E. van Vogt
 Half-Bad Writers
 One Sane Man: Robert A. Heinlein
 Asimov and Empire
 More Chuckleheads
 When I Was in Kneepants: Ray Bradbury
 The Vorpal Pen: Theodore Sturgeon
 Anthologies
 Genius to Order: Kuttner and Moore
 Kornbluth and the Silver Lexicon
 The Jagged Blade: James Blish
 Overalls on Parnassus: Fletcher Pratt
 Microcosmic Moskowitz
 New Stars
 Curiosa
 The Giants
 Pitfalls and Dead Ends
 What next?
Bibliography
Index

The second edition (Advent, 1967) included the additional chapters:

 Half Loaves
 Amphibians
 B-R-R-R!
 Decadents
 Britons
 Symbolism

"Symbolism" is chapter-long essay on the symbolism in James Blish's short story "Common Time", first published in a 1967 issue of Science Fiction Forum.

The third edition, published 1996, interwove additional chapters, including personal reminiscences:

Introduction, by Anthony Boucher
Author's Notes
 Myself When Young
 Critics
 The Classics
 Chuckleheads
 Campbell and His Decade
 Cosmic Jerrybuilder: A. E. van Vogt
 Half-Bad Writers
 One Sane Man: Robert A. Heinlein
 Asimov and Empire
 More Chuckleheads
 When I Was in Kneepants: Ray Bradbury
 The Vorpal Pen: Theodore Sturgeon
 The Excluded Data: Charles Fort
 Microcosmic Moskowitz
 Anthologies
 Half Loaves
 Genius to Order: Kuttner and Moore
 Kornbluth and the Silver Lexicon
 The Jagged Blade: James Blish
 Overalls on Parnassus: Fletcher Pratt
 Amphibians
 New Stars
 Curiosa
 Br-r-r!
 Decadents
 Britons
 Pitfalls and Dead Ends
 Symbolism
 Milford and Clarion
 Science and the World
 What Is Science Fiction, Anyway?
 Writing Science Fiction
 What Next?
Acknowledgements
Bibliography
Index

Reception
Anthony Boucher described the original edition as "a comprehensive picture of the book publication of science fiction in the 1950s, valuable as a historical record, stimulating as a detailed analysis of faults and virtues, and delightful simply as good reading matter in its own right", P. Schuyler Miller reviewed the book favorably, saying that Knight "applies his rules honestly and mercilessly", although he also noted that Knight's close focus on technical aspects of writing sometimes ignored an author's ability to "cast a spell . . . even if the carpentry and design is shoddy".

Reviewing the second edition, Algis Budrys declared that "Damon Knight sets an as yet unequalled standard" for sf criticism, and praised Knight both for "his exact appreciations of the well done" as well as "how influential [he] was when summing up the subtle but suddenly obvious flaws in work that had seemed pretty good".

References

External links

1956 non-fiction books
Books of literary criticism
Hugo Award-winning works
Works by Damon Knight
American essay collections